Bartativ is a village (selo) in Lviv Raion, Lviv Oblast (province) of Ukraine. It belongs to Horodok urban hromada, one of the hromadas of Ukraine. 
The village has an area of 16,56 km2 and population of the village is around 723 persons. Local government is administered by Bartativska village council.

Geography 
The village of Bartativ is located along the Highway in Ukraine   connecting Lviv with Przemyśl.

History 
The date of establishment of the village is considered 1648, but for the first time the village mentioned in historical documents in the early 15th century.

Until 18 July 2020, Bartativ belonged to Horodok Raion. The raion was abolished in July 2020, as part of the administrative reform of Ukraine, which reduced the number of raions of Lviv Oblast to seven. The area of Horodok Raion was merged into Lviv Raion.

Cult constructions and religion 
An architectural monument of local importance of Horodok district is in the village of Bartativ:
 St. Basil's Ukrainian Greek-catholic church (wooden) 1826 (442-І/М)
 Wooden belfry 1826 (442-2/М)

Gallery

References

External links 
 village Bartativ
 Narys istoriyi sela Bartativ KhKh stolittya - Center for Urban History
 Бартатів // Дерев'яні церкви Галичини, Бартатів, Церква Св. Василя Великого 1889

Literature 
  – К. : ГРУРЕ, 1968 р.) Page 257

Villages in Lviv Raion